Sothern is a surname, and may refer to:

 Alan Sothern (born 28 July 1987), Irish field hockey player
 Ann Sothern (1909–2001), American film and television actress born Harriette Arlene Lake 
 Denny Sothern (1904–1977), major league baseball player
 E. H. Sothern (1859–1933), American actor
 Edward Askew Sothern (1826–1881), English actor
 Georgia Sothern (1913–1981), born Hazel Anderson, burlesque dancer 
 Jean Sothern (1893–1964), American actress 
 Sara Sothern (1895–1994), American stage actress
 Scot Sothern (born 1949), American photographer

See also

 Southern (disambiguation)